"Lamberghini" is a Punjabi-language song by the Indian singer-songwriter composer duo The Doorbeen featuring Ragini Tandan, released as a single by Speed Records on 25 February 2018 via YouTube and other online music steaming services. The title is a variant spelling of the car brand Lamborghini.

Personnel 

• Source - 
 Artist – Ragini Tandan
 Starring – Harshdaa
 Compose / Music – The Doorbeen
 Lyrics – The Doorbeen
 Director – Ankush Kathuria
 Director of Photography - Arindam Bhattacharjee
 Executive Producer – Mansi Srivastava
 Assistant Director – Akanksha Narang & Pankaj Saraswat
 Producer – Domnic Pereira
 Line Assistant – Ganesh & Rayeez
 Produced by – Satinder Kaur
 Production House – Water Productions
 Location Courtesy – Planet Hollywood, Goa
 Label – Speed Records

Reception 

The song became extremely popular with over 379 million views on YouTube as of March 2020. It is one of the most viewed Punjabi songs on YouTube. In an interview singer The Doorbeen said "Hope Lamberghini features in a film."

Renditions and remixes

Renditions 
 On MTV Unplugged Season 8, singer Dhvani Bhanushali sang Lamberghini.

Remixes 

Lamberghini Remix by DJ Chetas
Lamberghini Remix by DJ T
Lamberghini Remix by Conexxion Brothers
Lamberghini Remix by Shobhit Banwait (in collaboration with Pug Life Records®)

References 

 In Era

Indian songs
Punjabi-language songs
2018 songs
2018 singles